John Conrad Russell, 4th Earl Russell (16 November 1921 – 16 December 1987), styled Viscount Amberley from 1931 to 1970, was the eldest son of the philosopher and mathematician Bertrand Russell (the 3rd Earl) and his second wife, Dora Black. His middle name was a tribute to the writer Joseph Conrad, whom his father had long admired. He was the great-grandson of the 19th-century British Whig Prime Minister Lord John Russell. He succeeded to the earldom on the death of his father on 2 February 1970.

Education 
John Russell was educated at the progressive Dartington Hall School, the University of California, Los Angeles and Harvard University. Upon leaving Harvard in 1943 he returned to Britain and enlisted in the Royal Naval Reserve. In the Reserve, he learned the Japanese language.

Career 
Russell had a distinguished early career, working for the FAO among other organisations, but in later life he was diagnosed as schizophrenic. This made him the only person in the United Kingdom to be denied the vote on two counts, first, for being a peer and, second, for being insane. He delivered a speech in the House of Lords on 18 July 1978 that was considered so outlandish that to this day it was claimed to be the only speech unrecorded by Hansard, although it is included in the online version while lacking the final section that he had written but failed to read aloud after being interrupted.

Personal life 
He was married on 28 August 1946 to Susan Doniphan Lindsay, daughter of the poet Vachel Lindsay. They were divorced in 1955. They had three daughters: , Lady Sarah Elizabeth Russell , and Lady Lucy Catherine Russell (21 July 1948 – 11 April 1975). Neither Sarah nor Lucy married or bore children; Felicity had one daughter, Rowan. Like their father and mother, the three daughters suffered from serious mental health challenges. Lucy, who was Bertrand Russell's favourite grandchild, died from self-immolation, at the age of 26, in the forecourt of a church near Penzance, ostensibly protesting in the cause of world peace.

Russell was succeeded as Earl by his half-brother, the historian Conrad Russell, 5th Earl Russell.

References

Bibliography

External links

1921 births
1987 deaths
Earls Russell
Harvard University alumni
J
Bertrand Russell
People with schizophrenia
Royal Naval Reserve personnel